Joseph Wilson Baber Jr. (September 11, 1937 – March 19, 2022) was an American composer, violist, and composition teacher living in Lexington, Kentucky.

Life
Baber was born in 1937 in Richmond, Virginia, and died in Lexington, Kentucky. He was a Professor of Theory and Composition at the University of Kentucky from 1971 to 2021, and the longtime principal violist of Lexington Philharmonic Orchestra.

Selected works
 Op. 1: Duos for Violin and Viola
 Op. 2a: Longfellow Songs
 "It Is Not Always May"
 "The Aftermath"
 "Serenade"
 "The Rainy Day"
 "The Tide Rises, the Tide Falls"
 "Snow-flakes"
 Op. 2b: Emersonian Hymns
 "The Informing Spirit"
 "Compensation"
 "Thine Eyes Still Shined"
 "Thought"
 "Terminus"
 "To Ellen"
 "Nature"
 Op. 3: Miscellaneous Instrumental (1960)
 Op. 4: Wise Men And Shepherds, Christmas cantata (1951)
 Op. 5: Instrumental Works for Winds
 Sonnet for Solo Oboe, Flute and String Orchestra
 Meditation for Solo Bassoon
 Sketches for Flute and Piano
 Op. 6: Cavalier Lyrics (1960)
 "Song (Sedley)"
 "Why So Pale and Wan" (Sir John Suckling)
 "Take, O Take Those Lips Away" (Shakespeare)
 "The Constant Lover" (Sir John Suckling)
 "To a Lady Asking Him How Long He Would Love Her" (Sir George Etherege)
 "Of the Last Verses in the Book"
 "To Blossoms" (Robert Herrick)
 Op. 7: Serenade for String Orchestra
 Op. 8: Serenade for String Trio (1975)
 Op. 9: Shakespearean Madrigals
 "Fie on Sinful Fantasy"
 "Tell Me Where"
 "I Am Gone, Sir"
 "Who Is Sylvia?"
 "When Icicles Hang By the Wall"
 "Weep No More, Ladies"
 " Mistress Mine"
 "It Was a Lover and His Lass"
 "Under the Greenwood Tree"
 Op. 10: Overture to As You Like It
 Op. 11: Kingdom of the Heart's Content for Piano (Seasonal Sketches)
 Op. 12: American Songs (1957)
 "Words" (John Hay)
 "The Dying Lover" (Richard Henry Stoddard)
 "The Dark Hills" (Edwin Arlington Robinson)
 "Nancibel" (Bliss Carman)
 "To a Golden Haired Girl in a Louisiana Town" (Vachel Lindsey)
 "(Mysteries)" (Emily Dickenson)
 "Terminus" (Emerson)
 "Evening Song" (Sydney Lanier)
 "The Runner in the Skies" (James Oppenheim)
 "Force" (Edward Rowland Sill)
 Op. 13: Bagatelle-Preludes (for piano)
 Op. 14: Incidental Music (Michigan)
 Music for the play Tiger at the Gates (Jean Anouilh)
 Music for the play Our Town (Thornton Wilder)
 Honor's Concert Prize piece, Music for String Orchestra
 Castelnuovo-Tedesco Variations for Piano
 Sketchbooks: impressions in shorts score of mid-western scenes
 Preludes for Piano, written for Virginia Bodman (1959–1962)
 Op. 15: Two Sonatas for Viola and Piano
 Op. 16: Twelve American Pastorals for SSA and Cello Ensemble (Harmonium)
 Afternoon on a Hill (Edna St Vincent Millay)
 On a Dayward Height
 Valley Song (Carl Sandberg)
 (Indian Summer) (Emily Dickenson)
 Wind in the Sunlit Trees (Conrad Aiken)
 Former Barn Lot (Mark Van Doren)
 Wild Peaches (Elinor Wylie)
 A Winter Piece (William Cullen Bryant)
 Daisies (Bliss Carman)
 The Road (John Gould Fletcher)
 Meadowlarks (Sara Teasdale)
 The Spice Tree (Vachel Lindsey)
 Op. 16a: Five Pastorals for Soprano and lower strings
 Op. 17: The Klausli Service (Music for Richard Klausli and the Plymouth Congregationalist Church)
 Op. 18: Songbook: Miscellaneous Uncollected Songs
 Eldorado (Edgar Allan Poe)
 The Traveller (Vachel Lindsey)
 "A Boy's Will" (Longfellow: Stanzas 1 & 2 of My Lost Youth)
 I Will Build a House
 In the Train (Teasdale)
 A Vagabond Song (Bliss Carman)
 The First Snow-fall (Lowell)
 Wood Song (Teasdale)
 Afternoon on a Hill (Millay)
 A Winter Piece (Bryant)
 Meadowlarks (Teasdale)
 Op. 19: Shakespearean Songs for high voice and piano
 Full Fathom Five
 Willow Song
 Take, O Take Those Lips Away
 Under the Greenwood Tree
 Tell Me Where Is Fancy Bred
 The Master, The Swabber, The Boatswain
 Take, O Take Those Lips Away (second version)
 It Was a Lover and His Lass
 Blow, Blow, Thy Winter Wind
 Op. 20: Organ Preludes on Protestant Hymn Tunes
 Op. 21: Trio for Violin, Viola and Violoncello
 Op. 22: Rhapsody for Viola and Orchestra
 Op. 23: Sonata for Violin and Piano
 Op. 24: Overture: The New Land
 Op. 25: Trio for Oboe, Viola and Piano
 Op. 26: Concerto No. 1 for Viola and String Orchestra
 Op. 27: Psalms for Chorus SATB
 Op. 28: Concerto No. 2 for Viola and Orchestra
 Op. 29: Songs of Love and Loss
 Pity Me Not (Edna St Vincent Millay)
 The Net (Sara Teasdale)
 Men Loved Wholly Beyond Wisdom (Louise Bogan)
 This Quiet Dust (Emily Dickenson)
 Where No Thoughts Are (Anna Hempstead Branch)
 Op. 30: String Quartet
 Op. 31: Incidental Music (Illinois)
 Keyboard Toccatas (for Dwight Peltzer) (1969)
 Scherzo for Viola and Piano (1969)
 Op. 32: Divertimentos
 Op. 33: Songbook: Miscellaneous Uncollected Songs
 Go and Catch a Falling Star (John Donne)
 In Time of 'The Breaking of Nations' (Thomas Hardy)
 The Widow's Song (Pinkney)
 Up-Hill (Rossetti)
 Mnemosyne (Trumbull Stickney)
 Cradle Song of the Infant Jesus for Soprano, Viola and Organ (Old French Noel) (2012)
 Op. 34: Works for Unaccompanied String
 Op. 35: Music from the Kansas College Co-operative Composers Project
 Prelude for Band (1970–1971)
 Scherzo for Chamber Orchestra (1970)
 Carol (SATB)
 Alleluias (SATB)
 To Everything There Is a Season (SATB)
 I Beseech You, Therefore, Brethren (SATB) (1971)
 Op. 36: Three Madrigals on Lyrics by Thomas Campion for Solo Voices
 "I Care Not for These Ladies"
 "Rose-cheek'd Laura, come"
 "Now winter nights"
 Op. 37: Mephisto Rhapsody for Violin and Piano (1971)
 Op. 38: Partita for Keyboard (1975–2008)
 Op. 39: "Fox and Bear" – A Children's Guide to the Orchestra for Narrator and Orchestra
 Op. 40: Frankenstein: Opera in 4 Acts (with John Gardner) (1969–1980)
 Op. 41: Five Fantasias on Finnish Folk Songs for SATB and Piano 4-hands
 Kalliole Kukkulalle
 Minun Kultani
 Lapsuuden Ystavalle
 Ranalle-Istaja Neito
 Rukkaset
 Op. 42: Rumpelstiltskin: Opera in 2 Acts (with John Gardner)
 Op. 43: Landscapes for Soprano and Nine 'Cellos (T.S. Eliot)
 Op. 44: Missa Brevis for Women's Chorus SSA and Organ
 Op. 45: Rhapsody for Two 'Cellos and Orchestra
 Op. 46: Symphony No. 1 in E minor (1979)
 Op. 47: Six Sinfonias for Piano
 Op. 48: Music for St. Michaels (Church of St Michael the Archangel, Lexington)
 Op. 49: Three Fantasias for String Quartet
 Op. 50: Ere We Be Young Again (Robert Louis Stevenson)
 Good and Bad Children
 Looking Forward
 Whole Duty of Children
 At the Seaside
 Singing
 Rain
 Where Go the Boats
 The Swing
 My Bed Is a Boat
 Envoy
 Op. 51: Two Marches in the American Style for Orchestra (1981–1991)
 Op. 52: Samson and the Witch, Opera in 1 Act (with John Gardner) (1995)
 Op. 53: Songs from Shakespeare
 When Daisies Pied
 How Should I Your True Love Know
 Where the Bee Sucks
 Come unto These Yellow Sands
 You Spotted Snakes
 Orpheus with His Lute
 Who Is Sylvia
 Op. 54: Requiescat for Violin and Orchestra (1983) – in memoriam of John Gardner
 Op. 55: 'The Wild Swans at Coole' and other songs on poems of William Butler Yeats (1986)
 The Wild Swans at Coole
 Brown Penny
 Made Quiet
 First Love
 Remorse for Intermperate Speech
 Tom O'Roughley
 To a Child Dancing in the Wind
 Two Years Later
 When You Are Old
 The Lake Isle of Innesfree
 Op. 56: Songs for School Children (c. 1984)
 Some One (Walter de la Mare)
 How Doth the Lowly Crocodile (Lewis Carroll)
 Ariel's Song (William Shakespeare)
 Who Has Seen the Wind (Christina Rossetti)
 Op. 57: Songbook: Miscellaneous Uncollected Songs
 A Lover Pleads with His Friends for Old Friends (Yeats)
 Beloved Rivers (Marjorie England) (1987–1989)
 And That Is Life (Paul Laurence Dunbar) (1990)
 Full Moon (Sara Teasdale)
 The Philosopher (Millay)
 Home-Coming (Leonie Adams)
 Op. 58: 'Dark of the Moon' for mezzo-soprano (Sara Teasdale)
 Winter
 September Night
 Wisdom
 Low Tide
 "She Who Could Bind You"
 Foreknown
 At Tintagil
 The Fountain
 Epitaph
 Op. 59: Symphony No. 2 in D (1987–1991)
 Op. 60: Shiloh, for tenor, horn, and piano
 The Portent
 Misgivings
 Malvern Hill
 Shiloh
 Op. 61: The Shepherd's Calendar, suite for solo English Horn
 Op. 63: Heartland: A Runaway Summer Overture for Orchestra (1990)
 Op. 64: Steel Town, Capriccio for Chamber Orchestra (1990)
 Op. 65: Summer Music: Trio for Flute, Bassoon and Piano
 Op. 66: The Kentucky Suite for Orchestra
 Op. 67: St Louis Suite for Clarinet and Piano
 Op. 68: Fantasia for String Quartet
 Op. 69: Organ Preludes (1995)
 Op. 70: Songs for Our Children
 Op. 71: "Echo" and "The First Spring Day" for Soprano, Flute, Clarinet and String Orchestra
 Op. 72: Two Songs for a Christening for Soprano and Organ or Strings
 Op. 73: Heartland: September Towns
 Op. 74: Madrigals from Shakespeare (1997)
 Under the Greenwood Tree
 How Should I Your True Love Know
 It Was a Lover and His Lass
 Willow Song
 Take, O Take Those Lips Away
 O Mistress Mine
 Op. 75: Songbook: Miscellaneous Uncollected Songs
 Op. 80: An American Requiem (1999–2003)
 Op. 81: Introduction and Allegro for Six Cellos
 Op. 89: Two Movements Concertante for Oboe and Small Orchestra (2003)
 Op. 90: Sonata for Three Cellos and Piano (2006)
 Op. 91: Album of American Ghosts (2006)
 Op. 94: Suite Concertante for flute and string orchestra
 Op. 99: River of Time: An Opera in 2 Acts (with Jim Rodgers) (2009)

References

External links
 

1937 births
2022 deaths
20th-century American composers
20th-century classical composers
21st-century American composers
21st-century classical composers
American classical composers
American male classical composers
American opera composers
American classical violists
Male opera composers
Musicians from Lexington, Kentucky
Musicians from Richmond, Virginia
University of Kentucky faculty
Classical musicians from Virginia
20th-century American male musicians
21st-century American male musicians
20th-century violists
21st-century violists